Dacalana irmae is a butterfly of the family Lycaenidae first described by Hisakazu Hayashi, Heinz G. Schroeder and Colin G. Treadaway in 1983. It is endemic to the Philippines and found only on Sibuyan Island. The forewing length is 17.5–20 mm.

References

Hayashi, Hisakazu; Schrőder, Heinz & Treadaway, Colin G. (1983). "Neue Arten und Unterarten der Gattungen Dacalana und Pratapa von den Philippinen (Insecta: Lepidoptera: Lycaenidae)". Senckenbergiana Biologica. 63 (1/2): 47-59.
Treadaway, C. G. (1995). "Checklist of the butterflies of the Philippine Islands (Lepidoptera: Rhopalocera)". Nachrichten des Entomologischen Vereins Apollo. Suppl. 14: 7-118.

Treadaway, C. G. & Schrőder, Heinz (2012). "Revised checklist of the butterflies of the Philippine Islands (Lepidoptera: Rhopalocera)". Nachrichten des Entomologischen Vereins Apollo. Suppl. 20: 1-64.

Butterflies described in 1983
Dacalana